Yousef Salech (born 17 January 2002) is a Danish professional footballer who plays as a forward for HB Køge, on loan from Brøndby IF.

Career
Salech signed his first professional contract with Danish Superliga club Brøndby on 28 June 2021, a four-year deal. He made his debut on 1 May 2022, coming on as a substitute for Marko Divković in the 73rd minute of a 2–1 league loss to Randers. On 31 August 2022, Salech was loaned out to Danish 1st Division side HB Køge for the rest of the season.

Career statistics

References

2002 births
Living people
People from Gentofte Municipality
Footballers from Copenhagen
Danish men's footballers
BK Skjold players
Hellerup IK players
Brøndby IF players
HB Køge players
Danish 2nd Division players
Danish Superliga players
Association football forwards